Tritiated water is a radioactive form of water in which the usual protium atoms are replaced with tritium. In its pure form it may be called tritium oxide (T2O or 3H2O) or super-heavy water. Pure T2O is corrosive due to self-radiolysis. Diluted, tritiated water is mainly H2O plus some HTO (3HOH).  It is also used as a tracer for water transport studies in life-science research.  Furthermore, since it naturally occurs in minute quantities, it can be used to determine the age of various water-based liquids, such as vintage wines.

The name super-heavy water helps distinguish the tritiated material from heavy water, which contains deuterium instead.

Applications
Tritiated water can be used to measure the total volume of water in one's body. Tritiated water distributes itself into all body compartments relatively quickly. The concentration of tritiated water in urine is assumed to be similar to the concentration of tritiated water in the body. Knowing the original amount of tritiated water that was ingested and the concentration, one can calculate the volume of water in the body.

 Amount of tritiated water (mg) = Concentration of tritiated water (mg/ml) × Volume of body water (ml)
 Volume of body water (ml) = [Amount of tritiated water (mg) − Amount excreted (mg)] / Concentration of tritiated water (mg/ml)

Adverse health effects
Tritiated water contains the radioactive hydrogen isotope tritium. As a low energy beta emitter with a half-life of about 12 years, it is not dangerous externally because its beta particles are unable to penetrate the skin. However, it is a radiation hazard when inhaled, ingested via food or water, or absorbed through the skin. HTO has a short biological half-life in the human body of 7 to 14 days, which both reduces the total effects of single-incident ingestion and precludes long-term bioaccumulation of HTO from the environment. Biological half-life of tritiated water in the human body, which is a measure of body water turnover, varies with season. Studies on the biological half-life of occupational radiation workers for free water tritium in the coastal region of Karnataka, India show that the biological half-life in the winter season is twice that of the summer season.

References

Nuclear materials
Forms of water
Body water